Starý Rybník castle is at the village of Starý Rybník, about  from Františkovy Lázně, in Cheb District of Karlovy Vary Region, western Bohemia, Czech Republic.

Ruins of Starý Rybník castle are on a small rocky ridge between two ponds at the village of Starý Rybník in the district of Cheb. The castle was likely constructed during the latter half of the 14th century. Soon afterwards, the castle passed on to the Frankengrüner family from Cheb and was later acquired by the Gumerauers and the Brambachs. Throughout the most of the 16th century it belonged to the Lords of Wirsperg.In the following years, it frequently changed hands, from the Trautenbergs to the Hartenbergs and later to the Perglars of Perglas. In 1787, it was acquired by Johann Georg Wilhelm whose family held it up to 1945.

See also
 List of castles in the Karlovy Vary Region

References

External links

 Hrad Starý Rybník at Hrady Dějiny.cz

Stary Rybnik
Castles in the Karlovy Vary Region